Jackson J. Weaver (September 3, 1920 – October 20, 1992) was an American broadcaster and voice actor.

Career
In addition to being the original voice for Smokey Bear as seen on the 1969 cartoon The Smokey Bear Show, he was the co-host of WMAL's Washington, D.C. morning drive program for 32 years, along with his broadcast partner Frank Harden.

Death
Weaver's final broadcast was on October 14, 1992, only six days before his death.

Filmography

References

External links

American male voice actors
1920 births
1992 deaths
20th-century American male actors